Drunk Ship is the translation from Spanish of the 50 pages collection of poems Barco Ebrio by Salvador Reyes Figueroa, originally published in 1923, Santiago, Chile, by editorial Nascimiento. It is the very first work of this writer.

Contents 

The book features a number of poems with marine subjects, whose titles are:
 Espejo
 Evocación
 Puerto
 Taberna
 Viaje
 Barco
 Sombra
 Partida
 Mía
 Tea Room
 Holocausto
 Ruta
 Soledad
 Saudade
 Pasado
 Intensidad
 Anhelo
 Música
 Cantar de los cantares
 Peregrinario
 Ciudad de oro
 Film
 El oso
 Nocturno
 Otoño
 Cabaret

Effect 

Drunk Ship spoke about marine subjects in a casual style. For that reason, it was not unnoticed by the formal local cultural environment of its time. García Oldini, for instance, considered it one of the books that changed Chilean poetry: 

Arthur Rimbaud used the same title for one of his poems.

References

External links 

Barco ebrio Antofagasta, 1963 edition by editorial Imprentas Unidas, Biblioteca Nacional (Chilean National Library) collection MC0011400. Released to the public by Memoria Chilena in PDF format.

Chilean literature